Tobacco Landing is an unincorporated community in Harrison County, Indiana, in the United States.

History
Tobacco Landing had a ferry across the Ohio River in the 19th century.

References

Unincorporated communities in Harrison County, Indiana
Unincorporated communities in Indiana